William Brickell (May 22, 1817(?) – January 14, 1908) joined Julia Tuttle as a co-founder of Miami, Florida.

During the Civil War, Brickell and his wife Mary, whom he met and married in Australia, lived in the White House while he worked as an aide to President Abraham Lincoln.

In 1868, the Brickells purchased two tracts of land, one of which stretched from Coconut Grove to the Miami River, which they purchased from Mrs. Harriet English and her brother Richard Fitzpatrick who had acquired it by grant from the King of Spain. The family moved to southern Florida from Cleveland, Ohio, arriving by ship in 1871. He and his family opened a trading post and post office in their home on the south bank of the Miami River, near the site of Fort Dallas.

The Brickells' neighbor, Julia Tuttle, also originally from Cleveland, is credited with attracting the attention of Florida's east coast railroad and resort hotel magnate Henry M. Flagler to extend his interests to the area. Both Brickell and Tuttle contributed land to the Flagler's Florida East Coast Railway, which brought growth and development and put Miami on the map. After William Brickell's death, his widow, Mary Brickell, became one of the young city's prominent real estate developers and managers.

Originally, William and Mary Brickell were entombed on their property located at 501 Brickell Avenue, Miami, but in 1946 their daughter Maud Brickell decided to move her parents to Woodlawn Park Cemetery and Mausoleum (now Caballero Rivero Woodlawn North Park Cemetery and Mausoleum).

See also
Brickell
Brickell Avenue

References

 Beth Brickell. William and Mary Brickell: Founders of Miami and Fort Lauderdale. The History Press, 2011 

1817 births
1908 deaths
People from Miami
Florida pioneers
19th-century American businesspeople